Laurence Patrick "Larry" Byrne (1888–1939) was an Irish journalist and literary critic who wrote extensively on the Irish Literary Revival under the pen name Andrew E. Malone. Born and raised in Dublin, he worked for the Irish Agricultural Wholesale Society and Irish Agricultural Co-operative Society and was involved in the New Ireland journal run by Patrick Little, whom he introduced to co-operative managers from revolutionary Russia.

Kevin O'Shiel described Byrne as politically "a stable middle-of-the road man" and an admirer of "English Liberalism". He stood unsuccessfully for the Labour Party in the 1925 Seanad election.

Bibliography
 
 
 
 
 
 
 
 
 
  (about Brian Oswald Donn-Byrne)

References

Sources

Citations

1888 births
1939 deaths
Irish journalists
Irish literary critics
Labour Party (Ireland) politicians
Politicians from Dublin (city)
20th-century journalists